Rúben Rodrigues may refer to:
Rúben Rodrigues (footballer, born 1987), Portuguese footballer who plays as a forward
Rúben Rodrigues (footballer, born 1996), Portuguese footballer who plays as a forward